Grosse Pointe Blank is a 1997 American black comedy film directed by George Armitage from a screenplay by Tom Jankiewicz, D. V. DeVincentis, Steve Pink and John Cusack. It stars Cusack, Minnie Driver, Alan Arkin and Dan Aykroyd and follows the story of assassin Martin Q. Blank (Cusack), who returns to his titular hometown to attend a high school reunion. The film's score was composed by Joe Strummer, former member of the punk rock band the Clash; the film's soundtrack contains a number of popular and alternative punk rock, ska and new wave songs.

Grosse Pointe Blank was released by Buena Vista Pictures, receiving generally positive reviews from critics and grossing $31 million.

Plot
As professional assassin Martin Blank prepares for a job, his assistant, Marcella, informs him that he has received an invitation to his ten-year high school reunion. A rival assassin, Grocer, approaches him about joining his fledgling union, which Martin refuses, preferring to work alone. Martin’s job goes badly when he is forced to shoot the target, even though the assignment was to make it appear the target died of natural causes. His client demands that he make amends by killing a Federal witness in Detroit, Michigan, close to his hometown of Grosse Pointe, where the reunion is taking place.

In Grosse Pointe Martin reconnects with his childhood friend Paul and high-school sweetheart, Debi Newberry, now a radio DJ, whom Martin had abandoned on prom night to enlist in the Army.

Martin is stalked by Felix LaPoubelle, another hitman, who attempts to kill Martin. He is also followed by two National Security Agency agents who were tipped off to Martin's contract by Grocer. Martin remains distracted by his desire to reconcile with Debi and procrastinates in opening the dossier on his target. Grocer reveals that LaPoubelle was hired by a wealthy dog owner whose prize retriever was killed on one of Martin's previous assignments. Martin reveals that he knows Grocer put the agents on his trail and again refuses to join the union.

Debi is conflicted about her feelings for Martin, but he manages to persuade her to attend the reunion with him. At the reunion Martin and Debi rekindle their relationship as they dance together intimately, and sneak off to have sex. Martin runs into LaPoubelle, whom he kills in self-defense. Debi stumbles upon the scene and flees the reunion in shock.

Debi confronts Martin in his hotel room. He reveals that when he joined the Army his psychological profile indicated a "moral flexibility" that prompted the Central Intelligence Agency to recruit him as an assassin, after which he decided to freelance. Martin assures Debi that he accepts only contracts on corrupt individuals. His efforts to rationalize his work anger Debi and she rejects his attempts at reconciliation.

Martin decides to retire from being a contract killer. He fires his psychiatrist, Oatman, over the phone, provides Marcella with a generous severance and finally opens the dossier detailing the contract that brought him to Grosse Pointe. He discovers the target is Debi's father, Bart, who is scheduled to testify against Martin's client.

Grocer decides to kill Bart himself to impress Martin's client and eliminate Martin as a competitor. Martin abandons the contract, saves Bart and takes him home. Grocer, his cohorts, and the NSA agents descend upon the house. During the siege Martin tells Debi that he left her on prom night to protect her from his homicidal urges; however, having fallen in love with Debi again, he has developed a newfound respect for life. Martin kills Grocer's henchmen and they both shoot the NSA agents when they burst onto the scene. Out of ammunition, Martin takes out Grocer with a TV set.  Martin proposes marriage to Debi, who is too stunned by the killing spree to respond, though Debi's father quips, "You have my blessing."

Debi and Martin leave Grosse Pointe together, with Martin visibly cheerful, and Debi confessing on her prerecorded radio show that she's decided to give love another chance.

Cast

 John Cusack as Martin Q. Blank
 Minnie Driver as Debi Newberry
 Alan Arkin as Dr. Oatman
 Dan Aykroyd as Grocer
 Joan Cusack as Marcella
 Jeremy Piven as Paul Spericki
 Hank Azaria as CIA Agent Steven Lardner
 Barbara Harris as Mary Blank
 Mitchell Ryan as Mr. Bart Newberry
 K. Todd Freeman as CIA Agent Kenneth McCullers
 Michael Cudlitz as Bob Destepello
 Benny Urquidez as Felix La Poubelle
 Carlos Jacott as Ken
 Jenna Elfman as Tanya
 Steve Pink as Terry Rostand
 Brent Armitage as Cosmo
 Ann Cusack as Amy
 Belita Moreno as Mrs. Kinetta
 K.K. Dodds as Tracy
 Bill Cusack as Waiter

Production
Screenwriter Tom Jankiewicz wrote the initial script for Grosse Pointe Blank in 1991 after receiving an invitation to his 10th high school reunion. He picked the title while substitute teaching for an English class at Upland High School, writing the title on the classroom's whiteboard to see how it would look on a movie-theater marquee. Jankiewicz decided to use Grosse Pointe, an upscale suburb of Detroit, Michigan, rather than his working-class hometown of Sterling Heights, Michigan, due to the contrast between the two towns. There is also the wordplay ("point blank"), which is a ballistics term of reference to the distance a bullet travels before dropping from the firearm's bore axis.

Jankiewicz simultaneously worked as a substitute teacher and a cashier at a Big Lots in Upland, California, to make ends meet before his script was picked up for production.

Jankiewicz, who was raised in Sterling Heights, based several of the film's characters on his real-life friends from Bishop Foley Catholic High School in Madison Heights, Michigan. For example, Jeremy Piven's character, Paul Spericki, was originally named after Jankiewicz's best friend during high school, although the name was changed during filming. The film's script was based on an urban legend about a student who became a professional hitman. Joan Cusack's character, Marcella, was named for Jankiewicz's manager at Big Lots.

George Armitage later said, "I did as much as anyone did in terms of writing", but did not seek credit.
The script, when I met with John [Cusack] and the writers, was 132 pages. I said: "Look, I'm not doing anything over 100 pages." They said, "Okay," and they did a rewrite, and it came back 150 pages. So I said "Okay, you guys are fired," and I spent most of preproduction rewriting the screenplay, getting it down to 102 pages. Then we would improvise, and I noticed that some of the stuff I'd cut out was in the improvs, they were bringing back stuff that I'd cut out, but we had a good time with it.

Only the aerial footage of Lakeshore Drive was actually shot in Grosse Pointe. The city of Grosse Pointe Farms did not allow the filmmakers to use any shots of Grosse Pointe South High School for the movie due to the presence of alcohol in the reunion scenes. The majority of the film was shot in Monrovia, California. In a 1997 interview, actor John Cusack, who shares the film's screenwriting credit along with Jankiewicz, Steve Pink, and D. V. DeVincentis, said he would have liked to film on location in Grosse Pointe, but they were unable to move production to Michigan due to budget constraints.

The scene where Martin is attacked by LaPoubelle while exploring the halls of his old high school was filmed at Reseda High School in the San Fernando Valley.

Armitage later recalled:
With Grosse Pointe Blank I shot three movies simultaneously. We shot the script as written, we shot a mildly understated version, and we shot a completely over-the-top version, which usually was what was used. We cast that movie—and I've cast most movies—by having the actors come in and read, then throwing the script out and saying: "Okay, let's improvise." That's what I was comfortable with. I say to the actors: "You are creating the character. This is written, these are the parameters, this is the outline. Now you take this, make it your own, and bring me, bring me, bring me."... I'm very fond of Grosse Pointe Blank because of that, the insanity of it was trying to keep things working with three different registers to choose from.
Armitage says he shot several endings:
I'm usually rather rough on studio heads in terms of creative help, but after seeing the audience so angry at Alec Baldwin dying in Miami Blues, I decided that on Grosse Pointe Blank, this time, dealing with another psychopath, another sociopath, John's character—I just wanted him to survive, and we shot so many different endings. They were so generous at Disney, we had Michael Ovitz and Joe Roth running the place, they were really great with us. We shot two or three different endings, the two of them getting together, talking about things, and everything didn't work. And Joe Roth said at one of the screenings: "When the father says 'You've got my blessing' in the bathtub at the end, after the shoot-out, just cut to the two of them leaving." I thought, "Let's give it a shot," and it worked beautifully.

Reception

Box office
The film earned an estimated $6,870,397 in its opening weekend, ranking number four at the box office. It went on to earn $28,084,357 in the United States, and a total of $31,070,412 worldwide. In the United States, it was released the same month as Romy and Michele's High School Reunion, another 1980s-themed high school reunion film that Disney was involved with.

Critical response

Grosse Pointe Blank received positive reviews from critics. Review aggregation website Rotten Tomatoes gave the film a rating of 81%, based on 72 reviews, with an average rating of 7.10/10. The website's critical consensus reads: "A high-concept high school reunion movie with an adroitly cast John Cusack and armed with a script of incisive wit." Metacritic gave the film a score of 76 out of 100, based on reviews from 27 critics, indicating "generally favorable reviews". Audiences polled by CinemaScore gave the film an average grade of "B" on an A+ to F scale.

Peter Travers of Rolling Stone magazine wrote a positive review. Travers praised the writing as "smart, not smartass", praised director George Armitage for smashing action scenes that reveal character, praised Aykroyd and the talented cast in smaller supporting roles, and ultimately said the film "flies on Cusack’s seductive malevolence," and called him a marvel.
Roger Ebert gave the film 2.5 stars out of 4. He praised the chemistry between the lead actors and enjoyed the dialogue, but considered it a near-miss, wishing for a wittier, more articulate, better ending.

Soundtrack

The score for Grosse Pointe Blank was composed by Joe Strummer, formerly of the Clash, and the soundtrack includes two songs by the Clash: "Rudie Can't Fail" and their cover version of Willi Williams' "Armagideon Time".

In addition to the Clash, the tracks featured in the film are largely a mix of popular and alternative 1980s punk rock, ska, and new wave from such bands as Violent Femmes, Echo & the Bunnymen, the Specials, the Jam, Siouxsie and the Banshees and A-ha. While most songs played throughout the film (especially at the reunion) had been recorded by the time of the students' graduation in 1986, several songs were recorded later. Joe Strummer's scoring captured music that aired before their graduation in 1986 as well as newer songs that were thematically in line with the '80s music, but which were released in time for the 10-year reunion in 1996. The post-graduation/pre-reunion songs include:

 The Guns N' Roses version of Paul McCartney's "Live and Let Die", heard in the scene where Martin first visits the Ultimart, was released in 1991.
 Los Fabulosos Cadillacs' "Matador", heard during the dance scene at the reunion, was released in 1993.
 The Specials' version of "Pressure Drop", played by Debi at the radio station during her "'80s weekend" was released in 1996.
 Eels' "Your Lucky Day in Hell", heard when Martin and Debi visit the Hippo Club for drinks, was also released in 1996.

The soundtrack album reached number 31 on the Billboard 200 chart, prompting the release of a second volume of songs from the film.

Grosse Pointe Blank – Music From the Film
 "Blister in the Sun" - Violent Femmes (2:08)
 "Rudie Can't Fail" - The Clash (3:31)
 "Mirror in the Bathroom" - English Beat (3:09)
 "Under Pressure" - David Bowie and Queen (4:03)
 "I Can See Clearly Now" - Johnny Nash (2:46)
 "Live and Let Die" - Guns N' Roses (3:02)
 "We Care a Lot" - Faith No More (4:03)
 "Pressure Drop" - The Specials (4:18)
 "Absolute Beginners" - The Jam (2:50)
 "Armagideon Time" - The Clash (3:53)
 "Matador" - Los Fabulosos Cadillacs (4:34)
 "Let My Love Open the Door (E. Cola Mix)" - Pete Townshend (4:58)
 "Blister 2000" - Violent Femmes (2:58)

This version of "Blister in the Sun" is a new recording that mirrors the original 1983 arrangement. It does not appear in the film. 
"Blister 2000" is a newly recorded, drastically rearranged version of "Blister in the Sun", which also does not appear in the film.

Grosse Pointe Blank – More Music From the Film
 "A Message to You, Rudy" - The Specials (2:53)
 "Cities in Dust" - Siouxsie and the Banshees (3:49)
 "The Killing Moon" - Echo & the Bunnymen (5:44)
 "Monkey Gone to Heaven" - Pixies (2:56)
 "Lorca's Novena" - The Pogues (4:35)
 "Go!" - Tones on Tail (2:32)
 "Let It Whip" - Dazz Band (4:24)
 "The Dominatrix Sleeps Tonight" - Dominatrix (3:40)
 "War Cry" - Joe Strummer (5:58)
 "White Lines (Don't Don't Do It)" - Melle Mel (7:24)
 "Take On Me" - A-ha (3:46)
 "You're Wondering Now" - The Specials (2:37)

"Go!" is the short version, originally issued as the B-side of "Lions".
"Let It Whip" is the LP version from Keep It Live.

Soundtrack omissions
Many songs from the film do not appear on the soundtracks.

Songs that appear in the film (in order of film appearance):
 "Blister in the Sun" (LP Version) - Violent Femmes 
 Johannes Brahms' "Fugue in A-Minor" - Jacques van Oortmerseen
 "Live and Let Die" (Muzak Version) - Adam Fields
 "Ace of Spades" - Motörhead
 "In Between Days" - The Cure
 "Your Lucky Day in Hell" - Eels
 "Sharks Can't Sleep" - Tracy Bonham
 "Little Luxuries" - The Burros
 "Big Boss Man" - Jimmy Reed
 "Detroit City" - Bobby Bare
 "Walk Like an Egyptian" - The Bangles
 "99 Luftballons" - Nena
 "Doors of Your Heart" - The English Beat

Songs in the trailer but not in the film:
 "I Got You Babe" - UB40 and Chrissie Hynde
 "Friend or Foe" - Adam Ant
 "Modern Love" - David Bowie

Home media
The film was released on VHS and DVD in 1998 in the United States, the United Kingdom, France, Australia and New Zealand.

Unofficial sequel
According to Joan Cusack, the 2008 film War, Inc. is an informal sequel. Both films are similar in style and theme, and both star John as an assassin and his sister Joan as his assistant, with Dan Aykroyd in a supporting role.

References

External links

 
 
 "The Recesses of High School" by Jo Scott-Coe, in River Teeth 9.2 (Spring 2008)

1990s crime comedy films
1997 romantic comedy films
1997 films
American comedy thriller films
American crime comedy films
American romantic comedy films
Caravan Pictures films
Class reunions in popular culture
1990s English-language films
Films about contract killing
Films about terrorism in the United States
Films directed by George Armitage
Films set in Michigan
Films shot in Michigan
Hollywood Pictures films
Films shot in Detroit
Films produced by Roger Birnbaum
American black comedy films
1990s American films